Michigan's 2nd congressional district is a United States congressional district in Western Michigan. The current 2nd district contains much of Michigan's old 4th congressional district, and includes all of Barry, Clare, Gladwin, Gratiot, Ionia, Isabella, Lake, Manistee, Mason, Mecosta, Montcalm, Newaygo, Oceana, and Osceola counties, as well as portions of Eaton, Kent, Midland, Muskegon, Ottawa and Wexford counties. Republican John Moolenaar, who had previously represented the old 4th district, was re-elected to represent the new 2nd in 2022.

Cities

Voting

History 
The 2nd congressional district today is largely the same as it was after the 1992 redistricting.  There have been some changes, but it still covers in general the same area.

Prior to the 1992 redistricting the 2nd district covered the northern half to two thirds of Livonia, Northville Township, the Wayne County portion of the city of Northville, Plymouth and Plymouth Township all in Wayne County.  It also covered most of Washtenaw County, Michigan but not Ann Arbor or Ypsilanti.  The only county entirely in the district was Hillsdale County.  Most of Jackson county was in the district, but the some of that county's northern tier townships were in Michigan's 6th congressional district.  About half of Lenawee County was in the district, and the far north-east portion of Branch county was also in the district.

In 1992, this district essentially became the 7th district, while the 2nd was redrawn to take in much of the territory of the old 9th district.

List of members representing the district

Recent election results

2012

2014

2016

2018

2020

2022

Historical district boundaries

See also

Michigan's congressional districts
List of United States congressional districts

Notes

References 
 Govtrack.us for the 2nd District - Lists current Senators and representative, and map showing district outline
 The Political graveyard: U.S. Representatives from Michigan, 1807-2003
U.S. Representatives 1837-2003, Michigan Manual 2003-2004

 Congressional Biographical Directory of the United States 1774–present

02
West Michigan
Northern Michigan
1843 establishments in Michigan
Constituencies established in 1843